Ioannis Papaioannou (born 20 April 1976) is a Greek chess grandmaster. He is a four-time Greek Chess Champion.

Chess career
Born in 1976, Papaioannou earned his grandmaster title in 1998. He won the Greek Chess Championship in 1997, 1998, 1999, and 2007. He is the No. 1 ranked Greek player

References

External links

1976 births
Living people
Chess grandmasters
Greek chess players
Sportspeople from Athens
20th-century Greek people